Balázs Balogh may refer to:

 Balázs Balogh (footballer, born 1982), Hungarian football defender for FC Ilves
 Balázs Balogh (footballer, born 1990), Hungarian football midfielder for Puskás Akadémia